The Boulevard Shopping Feira de Santana, was inaugurated on April 23, 1999 in the municipality of Feira de Santana, with the name of Iguatemi, but in October 2008 had its name changed to Boulevard Mall.

With approximately 193 / 194 stores, has nine anchor stores ( Hyper Bompreço, C & A, Le Biscuit, Lojas Americanas, Centauro, Lojas Renner, Lojas Riachuelo, Marisa and Orient Cinemas ) and 4 mega-stores ( Game-Over, Sleek, Atlantic Books and Leader ). Also has two banks ( Bank of Brazil and Caixa Economica ), a Lottery Agency, a post office and a 1-Parking Deck 2 floors and 437 seats.

Their food court has fast food chains, including McDonald's, Subway, Bob's, Ping Yan, and Casa do Pão de Queijo.

The mall also has a multiplex cinema network Orient Cinema Place with four theaters, one in digital 3D, and a large food court.

On June 6, 2011 opened its expansion, the establishment has won over 53 stores in 7,300 square meters and over 457 parking spaces, and hotel development with 120 apartments and commercial building with 256 rooms. Thus, the shopping center became the largest of the interior of the north-northeast Brazil.

External links
Boulevard Shopping Feira de Santana
Inaugurada a ampliação do Shopping Boulevard

Shopping centers in Brazil
Buildings and structures in Bahia